The 2014 USARL season was the fourth season of the USA Rugby League competition in the United States.  It began on Saturday, May 31, and concluded with the Championship Final on Saturday, August 23.  The Philadelphia Fight capped their first perfect season by defeating the Jacksonville Axemen 30-18 in Championship Final, claiming their third USARL Championship.

Teams
This season saw significant changes to the number of teams competing, as well as the structure of the competition.

In the wake of failed unification negotiations with the AMNRL in early 2014, it was announced at the USARL February 16 Annual General Meeting that the competition would be expanded by four teams: Brooklyn, Central Florida, Atlanta, and Tampa Bay. The competition would be split into two conferences (North and South) to accommodate expansion and reduce operating costs.  Furthermore, the North Conference would be split into two divisions: North East and North Atlantic.

The Northern Virginia Eagles withdrew from the AMNRL and joined the USARL.  They played in the new North Atlantic Division.

Regular season
The South Conference played a double round-robin schedule.  The North Conference (except Baltimore) played 7 games per team.  A win was worth 2 points, a draw worth 1 point, and a loss worth 0 points.  There were no bonus points for number of tries or close losses.

Playoffs
To accommodate the new conference and division structure, the USARL created a new playoff structure for 2014.  In the South Conference, all four teams automatically qualified for the South Conference Playoffs.  The teams with the best and worst records played each other, as did the teams with the second- and third-best records.  The winners played in the South Conference Championship.  In the North Conference, the teams with the first- and second-best record in each division played each other in the North Conference Playoffs.  The winners played in the North Conference Championship.  The winners of the Conference Championships met in the Championship Final.

References

USARL season
USA Rugby League
Seasons in American rugby league
2014 in American sports